Rhynchotheca is a genus of flowering plants belonging to the family Geraniaceae.

Its native range is Ecuador to Peru.

Species:
 Rhynchotheca spinosa Ruiz & Pav.

References

Geraniaceae
Geraniales genera